Arthur's Town is a town in the Bahamas. It is located on Cat Island. The population is 143 as of the 2010 census.

Bahamian-American actor Sidney Poitier was raised around Arthur's Town.

Transportation
The village is served by Arthur's Town Airport.

References

External links
World Gazetteer

Populated places in the Bahamas
Cat Island, Bahamas